The Institute of Divine Metaphysical Research (IDMR) is an organization founded in 1931 by Henry Clifford Kinley, author of Elohim the Archetype (Original) Pattern of the Universe.

References
 The Tennessean, July 14,2001: "Metaphysics group teaches knowledge vs. dogma"
 The Topeka Capital-Journal, June 22, 2001, "Searching for understanding"
 Online Article: The Augusta Chronicle, July 22, 2000, "Metaphysical means"
 Los Angeles Times, March 12, 1994: "Conference Calmly Prepares for the End of World-by 1996 Doomsday: Members of Institute of Divine Metaphysical Research expect the earth to `rest.' But they feel relief rather than fear."
 New York Times, February 15, 2004, article on basketball player Otis Birdsong mentions his affiliation with the group: "For Birdsong, High School Was the Peak"

External links
 IDMR Official Website
 Preface to the Holy Name Bible used by IDMR members
 Evangelize America Ministries article on IDMR
 Sacred Name Movement in America

Christian organizations established in 1931
Sacred Name Movement